Elandon Roberts (born April 22, 1994) is an American football linebacker for the Pittsburgh Steelers of the National Football League (NFL). He played college football at Houston. He was drafted by the New England Patriots in the sixth round of the 2016 NFL Draft.  He plays primarily as a linebacker on defense, but when injuries during the 2019 season left the Patriots without a fullback on the roster, Roberts began to play that position as well.

Early years
Roberts attended Memorial High School in Port Arthur, Texas. He was a member of both the football team and the track & field team.

College career
Roberts played college football for Morgan State as a freshman linebacker in 2012. He finished the season with 107 tackles to lead the team and finish second in the Mid-Eastern Athletic Conference (MEAC) while at Morgan State University which competes in the NCAA Division I Football Championship Subdivision. The 107 tackle total marked the second-best single-season effort in program history, and He also had nine tackles for a loss, two sacks, one interception, and two pass breakups as well. Roberts was named to the All-MEAC second-team in 2012 and finished 11th in the Jerry Rice Award, given to the nation's top freshman on the FCS level. Roberts was also named the MEAC Rookie of the Week three times.

After his freshman season, Roberts transferred to play football at University of Houston from 2013 - 2015. In 2013, he saw action in eight games as a backup linebacker. As a junior in 2014, Roberts appeared in 12 games as a linebacker and on special teams. As a senior in 2015, Roberts was a team captain and had 142 total tackles which was good enough to lead the American Conference and place him fourth in the nation.  However, his 88 solo tackles led all of the FBS.

Professional career
On December 22, 2015, it was announced that Roberts had accepted his invitation to play in the NFLPA Collegiate Bowl. On January 23, 2016, Roberts recorded one tackle for a four-yard loss during the NFLPA Collegiate Bowl and was part of Mike Holmgren's National team that defeated the American team 18–17. On March 24, 2016, He participated at Houston's pro day and had an impressive performance. Multiple scouts stated they were impressed with his power, mobility, and his performance in positional drills supervised by Houston Texans' defensive coordinator Mike Vrabel. At the conclusion of the pre-draft process, the majority of NFL draft experts and scouts projected Roberts to be a sixth or seventh round pick with some expecting him to be selected as early as the fourth or fifth round. He was ranked as the tenth best inside linebacker prospect in the draft by DraftScout.com.

New England Patriots
The New England Patriots selected Roberts in the sixth round (214th overall) of the 2016 NFL Draft. Roberts was the 27th linebacker drafted in 2016. 

On May 7, 2016, the New England Patriots signed Roberts to a four-year, $2.44 million contract that includes a signing bonus of $100,356.

Throughout training camp, Roberts competed against Kamu Grugier-Hill, Rufus Johnson, Kevin Snyder, and C. J. Johnson for a roster spot as a backup linebacker. Head coach Bill Belichick named Roberts the backup middle linebacker to begin the regular season, behind Dont'a Hightower.

He made his first NFL start on October 16, 2016, against the Cincinnati Bengals and tied for second highest tackles on the team with seven in the win. In Week 16 against the New York Jets, Roberts led the team with 11 tackles including a forced fumble recovered by Malcolm Butler. On February 5, 2017, Roberts was part of the Patriots team that won Super Bowl LI. In the game, he recorded two tackles as the Patriots defeated the Atlanta Falcons by a score of 34–28 in overtime. The Patriots trailed 28–3 in the third quarter, but rallied all the way back to win the game which featured the first overtime game in Super Bowl history and the largest comeback in the Super Bowl.

Roberts entered the 2017 season as one of the Patriots' starting linebackers. He recorded his first two career sacks in a Week 12 win over the Miami Dolphins. Overall, in the 2017 season, he recorded 67 total tackles, two sacks, one pass defended, and one fumble recovery. Roberts helped the Patriots reach Super Bowl LII, but lost 41–33 to the Philadelphia Eagles with him recording six tackles in the game.

In 2018, Roberts played all 16 games and started in 11. The Patriots finished the season 11–5 and Roberts recorded 65 tackles, one sack, and four passes defended on the season. The Patriots reached Super Bowl LIII after defeating both the Los Angeles Chargers and Kansas City Chiefs in the playoffs. In the Super Bowl, Roberts recorded one tackle in the team's 13–3 victory against the Los Angeles Rams.

In 2019, Roberts was voted a team defensive captain for the first time, replacing safety Patrick Chung. He was a member of the team's high-performing linebacker corps, dubbed "The Boogeymen" by teammate Dont'a Hightower. Starting in Week 7, he began to play on offense as well as defense, where he was primarily used as a fullback after injuries to teammates James Develin and Jakob Johnson. Roberts finished the season with 29 tackles, a sack, a pass defense, and a tackle for loss.

Roberts scored his first career touchdown against the Miami Dolphins on December 29, 2019, when he caught a 38-yard touchdown pass from Tom Brady during the 27–24 loss.

Miami Dolphins
On March 24, 2020, the Miami Dolphins signed Roberts to a one-year, $2 million contract that includes a $1 million signing bonus. The signing reunited Roberts with Dolphins' head coach Brian Flores, who had previously been the linebackers coach for the New England Patriots. Roberts was also reunited with former Patriots linebackers Kyle Van Noy and Kamu Grugier-Hill. He was named a starting inside linebacker alongside Jerome Baker. On December 31, 2020, Roberts was placed on injured reserve. He played in 13 games with 11 starts, recording 61 tackles, 1.5 sacks, one forced fumble and a fumble recovery.

Roberts re-signed with the Dolphins on March 24, 2021. He was named a starting linebacker in 2021, playing in all 17 games with 15 starts, recording a career-high 83 tackles, one sack, four passes defensed, two forced fumbles and an interception.

On March 18, 2022, Roberts re-signed with the Dolphins.

Pittsburgh Steelers
On March 16, 2023, Roberts signed a two-year contract with the Pittsburgh Steelers.

Personal life
Roberts has three siblings. His older brother, Eli Roberts, graduated from Sam Houston State University with a major in Criminal Justice.  His older sister, Elexsia Roberts, graduated from Wiley College in Education. Younger sister Elondria Roberts is a current student at Lamar University in Beaumont. His cousin Jermire played football at Iowa and his cousin Calvin played football at Oklahoma State.

References

External links
Miami Dolphins bio
New England Patriots bio
Houston Cougars bio
Morgan State Bears bio
Elandon Roberts NFL Draft Prospect Analysis

1994 births
Living people
American football linebackers
Houston Cougars football players
Miami Dolphins players
Morgan State Bears football players
New England Patriots players
Pittsburgh Steelers players
Players of American football from Texas
Sportspeople from Port Arthur, Texas
Memorial High School (Hedwig Village, Texas) alumni
Ed Block Courage Award recipients